The Lueriu is a right tributary of the Mureș in Mureș County, Romania. It flows into the Mureș near Suseni.

References

Rivers of Romania
Rivers of Mureș County